East LA Civic Center station is an at-grade light rail station on the L Line of the Los Angeles Metro Rail system. It is located at the intersection of 3rd Street and Mednik Avenue in East Los Angeles, California.  The station is served by the L Line. This station opened on November 15, 2009, as part of the Gold Line Eastside Extension. This station and all the other Eastside Extension stations will be part of the E Line upon completion of the Regional Connector project in 2023.

Service

Station layout 
East LA Civic Center station utilizes a simple island platform setup with two tracks in the median of East 3rd Street. There are two ramps for platform access, one at the intersection of Civic Center Way, leading to the namesake East LA Civic Center, and the other at the intersection of South Mednik Avenue.

Hours and frequency

Connections 
, the following connections are available:
 Los Angeles Metro Bus: , 
 El Sol: City Terrace/ELAC, Union Pacific/Salazar Park, Whittier Blvd./Saybrook Park
 Montebello Transit: 40

References

External links 
 
 Official Eastside Extension page LACMTA

L Line (Los Angeles Metro) stations
Eastside Los Angeles
Railway stations in the United States opened in 2009